Jian Zihao, better known by his in-game name Uzi, is a Chinese professional League of Legends player for Bilibili Gaming. Widely regarded as the greatest AD carry of all time, he is renowned for his mechanical prowess on champions such as Vayne, Kai'Sa, Ezreal and Kog'Maw. He was well known as the franchise player for Royal Never Give Up and its predecessors, although he also played briefly for OMG and Newbee.

Uzi has played in the World Championship grand finals twice, both times with Royal Club. His biggest accolade was when rapper Lil Uzi Vert credited his alias as tribute to the Chinese AD Carry. He won his first international title at the 2018 Mid-Season Invitational with his team Royal Never Give Up, after defeating the LCK champions Kingzone DragonX.

Uzi officially announced his retirement from professional play on Weibo on 3 June 2020. Uzi ended his career due to personal health issues.

Career 
Uzi began his professional career on the Chinese team Royal Club. Widely considered as one of the best AD carries during seasons three and four, Uzi demonstrated his great mechanic prowess and carried his team to two consecutive second-place finishes at the League of Legends World Championship in both 2013 and 2014. Despite their success at Season 3 Worlds, the departure of Tabe prompted Uzi to switch to the mid lane at the start of Season 4 before returning to the ADC role during the summer. Renamed to Star Horn Royal Club, Uzi with Korean imports inSec and Zero rose to the challenge and finished second at worlds with a 1:3 series against one of the best teams ever, Samsung White. And he left the Royal club for the communication problem with Korean imports.

Season 5 however, proved to be a slump in Uzi's career after moving to OMG. Despite being touted as one of the biggest talent transfers of the offseason, OMG incurred difficulties in integrating Uzi to the team. Coupled with the decline of Gogoing and Lovelin, Season 5 was a disappointing one for Uzi. Uzi was picked up by Qiao Gu Reapers and was their sub for Peco. QG was invited to IEM Katowice in March 2016 where they beat Fnatic in their first best of one but were then subsequently eliminated in the group stages following a loss to SK Telecom T1 and then losing to Fnatic 1 - 2.

In May 2016, Qiao Gu Reapers was acquired by Newbee. However, five days later Uzi's contract was bought out by Royal Never Give Up.

On 3 June 2020, Uzi announced his retirement from professional gaming, citing health concerns. In a statement he said, "As a result of staying up late for years, a fatty diet and being under insurmountable stress, last year I found out that I was type-2 diabetic." He added that his mental state was "not as good as it was before". In an effort to recover, he took medication and made changes to his work schedule and exercise habits, but his situation did not change. His doctor told him there could be "serious complications" if he continued playing competitively.

On 15 Dec 2021, Uzi announced he will return to the game and join BLG (Bilibili Gaming) as AD player. At the same time, Crisp Breath and Doggo join the BLG too. Uzi himself also responded to this situation. In the past two years, exercise and fitness have become indispensable things in his daily life, so he is still relatively confident in his body. But in the 2021 Spring LPL (League of Legends Pro League), Uzi has not participated any official game yet. On 1 Jan 2021, RNG (Royal Never Give up) 2:1 BLG (Bilibili Gaming). Uzi did not participate the game.

Tournament results

(Star Horn) Royal Club 
 2nd — Season 3 World Championship 
 2nd — 2014 League of Legends World Championship

Royal Never Give Up 
 2nd — 2016 Summer LPL
 5th–8th — 2016 League of Legends World Championship
 2nd — 2017 Spring LPL
 2nd — 2017 Summer LPL
 3rd–4th — 2017 League of Legends World Championship
 1st — 2018 Spring LPL
 1st — 2018 Mid-Season Invitational
 1st — 2018 Demacia Cup
 1st — 2018 Rift Rivals (Red Rift)
 1st — 2018 Summer LPL
 5th–8th — 2018 League of Legends World Championship
 9th–12th — 2019 League of Legends World Championship

Individual awards 
 MVP of 2018 LPL Spring Playoffs
 MVP of 2018 LPL Summer Playoffs
 MVP of 2018 Mid-Season Invitational
 MVP of 2018 Asian Games
 All-Star 1v1 2016 winner
 All-Star 1v1 2017 winner

References 

Living people
Chinese esports players
NewBee players
Royal Never Give Up players
Star Horn Royal Club players
League of Legends AD Carry players
OMG (esports) players
Year of birth missing (living people)
Esports players at the 2018 Asian Games